Hawksburn railway station is a commuter railway station in South Yarra, a suburb of Melbourne, Victoria, Australia. The station is listed on the Victorian Heritage Register, and was opened on 7 May 1879. The station is named after the locality of Hawksburn. The station consists of an island platform and two side platforms all accessed by a pedestrian bridge. There are two principal station buildings located on the central platform (platforms 2 and 3) and on platform 4, consisting of a small two and one-story brick buildings. These buildings were provided in 1914, as ticketing and staff offices. The station is only partially accessible due to a multiple steep access ramps.

Toorak railway station is served by the Frankston line, part of the Melbourne railway network. The station doesn't have any transport connections unlike the majority of Melbourne train stations. The journey to Flinders Street railway station is approximately 5.3 kilometres (3.29 mi) and takes 9 minutes.

Description 

Hawksburn railway station is located in the suburb of South Yarra, a suburb of Melbourne, Victoria. The station is located nearby to the Hawksburn shopping precinct and the Prahran Housing Commission Estate. The station is owned by VicTrack, a state government agency, and the station is operated by Metro Trains. The station is approximately 5.3 kilometres (3.29 mi), or an 9-minute train journey, from Flinders Street station. The adjacent stations are South Yarra station up towards Melbourne, and Toorak station down towards Frankston.

The station consists of a single island platform and two side platforms with a total of four platform edges. Standard in Melbourne, the platform has an asphalt surface with concrete on the edges. The platforms are approximately 160 metres (524.93 Ft) long, enough for a Metro Trains 7 car HCMT. The station features a pedestrian bridge, accessed from the centre of the platforms by a ramp. The station features two principal station buildings, both former ticketing offices which are now heritage listed staff facilities. Distinct Edwardian architectural features of the red brick station buildings include ornate parapets, cement banding, tall chimneys with terracotta pots, tiled hip roof with terracotta finials, and stucco walls.

The station building, platform, and overpass are largely the same as when originally built, with the main change being updated signage, technology, and the addition of one new platform canopy amongst other minor building and platform upgrades. There is no car parking available at the station. The station is listed as an "assisted access" station on the Metro Trains website, as the access ramp is too steep and would require assistance for wheelchair customers to traverse.

History

Hawksburn railway station was opened on 7 May 1879 with the station consisting of a single platform and track for commuter and freight service. Like the locality itself, the station was named after Hawksburn Estate, where the station is located. The first station buildings were opened on the site between 1881 and 1883 to coincide with the duplication of track between the city and Oakleigh. The current station was constructed in 1914 to provide improved and additional facilities to what had become an increasingly busy and important location on the train network. The station rebuild was part of level crossing removal works that removed all level crossings, rebuilt all stations, and quadruplicated the corridor between South Yarra and Caulfield by 1914. Later in 1922, the line was electrified using 1500 V DC overhead wires with three position signalling also introduced.

The station has mostly stayed the same since 1914, with only minor upgrades taking place. In 1972, the island platform (Platforms 2 and 3) was extended at both ends. In 1993, major re-signalling works occurred between Toorak and Caulfield stations. The station underwent minor upgrades with the installation of one new shelter on Platform 1 in the 2010s. In 2021, resignalling works occurred to upgrade the corridor to high capacity signalling as part of the Metro Tunnel project.

Platforms and services
Hawksburn has two side platforms and one island platform with four faces. The station is currently served by the Frankston line—a service on the metropolitan rail network. The Frankston line runs from Frankston station south east of Melbourne, joining the Cranbourne and Pakenham lines at Caulfield station before continuing onto the Werribee or Williamstown lines via Flinders Street station. Despite the Pakenham and Cranbourne lines operating through the station, these services do not stop at the station due to low station patronage, instead running express through the station.

Platform 1:
  stopping all stations to Flinders Street, Werribee and Williamstown.

Platform 2:
  stopping all stations to Frankston.

Platforms 3:
 No services stop at this platform. Cranbourne and Pakenham line services run express through this station.

Platform 4:
 No services stop at this platform. Cranbourne and Pakenham line services run express through this station.

Transport links 
Rare amongst Melbourne train stations, Hawksburn station has no other transport connections. There are other transport connections on Malvern and Toorak roads, however, these are over 200 metres (656 ft) away from the station. Toorak station does however have train replacement bus stops located adjacent to the station.

References

External links
 Public Transport Victoria
 

Railway stations in Melbourne
Railway stations in Australia opened in 1879
Railway stations in the City of Stonnington